Rockabilly Blues is the 64th album by American country singer Johnny Cash, released on Columbia Records in 1980. Highlights include "Cold Lonesome Morning," which had some minor chart success (No. 53 in the country charts), "Without Love," by his son-in-law, Nick Lowe, and a cover of the witty "The Twentieth Century Is Almost Over." The first two of the aforementioned songs were the only singles from the album, though "Without Love" hardly enjoyed any chart success, peaking at No. 78. "The Twentieth Century is Almost Over" was re-recorded five years later by Cash and Waylon Jennings, Willie Nelson and Kris Kristofferson, collectively known as The Highwaymen, on their first album entitled Highwayman, though it was, in essence, a duet with Nelson.

Track listing

Personnel

 Johnny Cash - vocals, rhythm guitar
 Bob Wootton, Pete Wade, Cliff Parker - electric guitar
 Martin Belmont, Jerry Hensley, Jack Routh, Marty Stuart, Eddy Shaver - guitar
 Jack Clement - dobro, acoustic guitar, producer
 Dave Kirby - acoustic guitar, guitar
 Jerry Hensley - electric, acoustic and rhythm guitar, dobro, harmony vocals
 Billy Joe Shaver - guitar, gut-string guitar
 Philip Donnelly - guitar
 Bobby Thompson - acoustic guitar, banjo
 Dave Edmunds - guitar, engineer
 W.S. Holland, Jerry Carrigan, Larrie Londin, Kenny Malone, Pete Thomas - drums
 Floyd Chance - upright bass
 Earl Poole Ball - electric and acoustic piano, producer
 Daniel Sarenana, John Willis - brass
 Joe Allen, Joe Osborn - electric bass
 Nick Lowe - electric bass, producer
 Shane Keister - Moog synthesizer, Prophet 5 synthesizer
 Terry McMillan - harmonica
 Irv Kane, Rex Peer - trombone on "One Way Rider"
 Don Sheffield, George Cunningham - trumpet on "One Way Rider"
 June Carter Cash - additional vocals on "One Way Rider"
 Charles Cochran - horn arrangement on "One Way Rider"

Production
Album produced by Earl Poole Ball
"Without Love" produced by Nick Lowe
"It Ain't Nothing New Babe" and "One Way Rider" produced by Jack Clement
Engineers: Gene Eichelberger at Quadrafonic Studio, Nashville, TN; Curt Allen at JMI Recording Studio, Nashville, TN; Dave Edmunds at U.K. Pro Studio, London, England
Back-up Engineers: Willie Pevear, Barbara Cline at Quadraphonic Studio, Nashville TN
Recorded at Quadraphonic Studio, JMI Recording Studio, U.K. Pro Studio
Front Cover Photography: Leonard Kamsler
Reissue Producer: Dave Nives
Project Coordinator: Kajetan Koci
Reissue Designer: Suzanne Ammon

Chart performance

Album

Singles

References

External links
 Luma Electronic entry on Rockabilly Blues

Johnny Cash albums
1980 albums
Columbia Records albums
Albums produced by Nick Lowe
Albums produced by Jack Clement